Castello di Pereto (Italian for Castle of Pereto)  is a  Middle Ages castle in Pereto, Province of L'Aquila (Abruzzo), Italy.

History

Architecture

References

External links

Pereto
Pereto